Garn-yr-erw is a village in south-eastern Wales, lying at the source of the Afon Llwyd north of Blaenavon and Pontypool, within the historic boundaries of Monmouthshire.  The village lies at an altitude of approx 400 metres  on the side of Gilwern Hill, Monmouthshire and is cited by the Ordnance Survey as the highest village in Wales.

The village had a station on the Pontypool and Blaenavon Railway from 1913 until the line's closure in 1941.

See also
Mining in Wales

References

External links

Welsh Coal Mines
The Lost Viaduct – Time Team

Villages in Torfaen